The 1999 Jacksonville Dolphins football team represented Jacksonville University as an independent during  the 1999 NCAA Division I-AA football season. Led by second-year head coach Steve Gilbert, the Dolphins compiled a record of 3–6. Jacksonville played their home games at D. B. Milne Field in Jacksonville, Florida.

Schedule

References

Jacksonville
Jacksonville Dolphins football seasons
Jacksonville Dolphins football